Kalsoume Sinare is a Ghanaian actress and former model. She has appeared in over fifty films, including Babina, Trinity, and Sala, for which she received a Golden Actress award in the Drama category.

Biography 
Sinare was the first of nine children in her family. She attended Accra High School, after which she started her entertainment career as a model. She represented Ghana at the 1990 Miss Model of the World pageant, and regularly appeared on television as a commercial model for consumer products.

Sinare made her acting debut in the stage production Theatre Mirrors, then began her film career in 1993 in Out of Sight. She became "immensely popular" in Ghana after she played the lead role in Babina, a religiously-themed horror film. She has appeared in over fifty films, including 4ever Young, The Five Brides, and The New Sun. Her role in the 2010 film Trinity earned a Zulu African Film Academy Awards nomination for Best Supporting Actress as well as a Best Supporting Actress nomination at the Ghana Movie Awards. She received a second Ghana Movie Awards nomination for Best Supporting Actress for her role in the 2013 film 3 Some. In 2017 her lead role in the film Sala won the Golden Actress award in the Drama category at the Golden Movie Awards.

Personal life 
Sinare married Ghanaian international footballer Anthony Baffoe in 1994. Both Sinare and Baffoe are Muslims. Sinare has publicly supported the National Democratic Congress in Ghanaian elections, and participated in the 2013 inauguration ceremony for John Mahama, whom she endorsed again in 2016. She is the sister of Ghanaian politician and former Ambassador to Saudi Arabia Said Sinare.

Filmography

References 

Living people
Ghanaian film actresses
20th-century Ghanaian actresses
21st-century Ghanaian actresses
Year of birth missing (living people)